VV Papendrecht (founded 1 August 1920) is an association football club from Papendrecht, Netherlands. In 2019–20, its first squad plays in Eerste Klasse after it promoted from the Tweede Klasse through playoffs.

History
During three periods, VV Papendrecht has played in the Hoofdklasse. Papendrecht played in the KNVB Cups of 1934–35, 1985–86, 1994–95, and 2008–09. Johan Sturrus is the manager since 2018.

References

Football clubs in the Netherlands
Football clubs in South Holland
Association football clubs established in 1920
1920 establishments in the Netherlands
Sport in Papendrecht